Thomas Grozier (25 August 1902 – 4 November 1960) was a Scottish professional footballer who played in the English Football League for Plymouth Argyle. He played as an outside right.

Grozier was born in Rutherglen, South Lanarkshire. He played for his local Junior club, Rutherglen Glencairn, before coming to England to play for Plymouth Argyle, for whom he made his debut in the English Football League in April 1928. He made 223 appearances for the club in all competitions, and was a regular choice for the first team for six seasons from 1929–30 onwards. His last appearance for the first team came on 26 October 1935, with a 2–0 defeat, after which he retired. He died in 1960.

References

1902 births
1960 deaths
Sportspeople from Rutherglen
Scottish footballers
Association football wingers
Rutherglen Glencairn F.C. players
Plymouth Argyle F.C. players
Scottish Junior Football Association players
English Football League players
Footballers from South Lanarkshire